Kahramana is a fountain located in Baghdad's Sa'adoon Street depicting a scene from the legend of Ali Baba and the Forty Thieves; a story taken from One Thousand and One Nights in which the slave girl Marjana outwitted the thieves by tricking them into hiding inside jars over which she poured hot oil. The statue was officially opened in 1971 and was the work of the Iraqi sculptor, Mohammed Ghani Hikmat. It has become one of Baghdad's most iconic public artworks. In the aftermath of the US-led invasion of 2003, the work assumed new meanings for the Iraqi people.

Background
From 1969 when Iraq became a republic and the  Hashemite monarchy was overthrown (the monarchy was overthrown and Iraq become a republic in 1958), leading artists and sculptors were commissioned to produce artworks that would beautify the city of Baghdad, glorify Iraq's ancient past and contribute to a sense of national identity. During this period, sculptors including Khaled al-Rahal, Jawad Saleem and Mohammed Ghani Hikmat executed a number of high profile public monuments which are now dotted around the city of Baghdad. 

Mohammed Ghani Hikmat, who was commissioned to construct Kahramana, was a well-known Iraqi sculptor, whose public works were on display throughout Baghdad's streetscapes and urban spaces. His works achieved popularity because they depicted scenes from the everyday life of Baghdad's people and also drew on Iraqi folklore.

Following the US-led invasion of 2003, some of Hikmat's work took on new meanings and new political interpretations emerged from Iraq's destruction. At the time, the Iraqis saw that the work represented the  new reality of their country and the number '40' became charged with meaning. The Provisional Governing Council, after the occupation, included forty people, which came to symbolise the forty thieves; and the decisions of the Iraqi civil administrator, Paul Bremer, consisted of 53 resolutions, with Resolution No. 40 referring to the dissolution of the Iraqi army. This resolution, which left some 400,000 Iraqi soldiers without employment, led to public protests and the Kahramana fountain became a popular starting point for public demonstrations and civil rights campaigners.

Specifications

 Monument type: Fountain
 Materials: Bronze
 Height: 3.3 metres
 Date opened: 1971
 Location: Kahramana Square, Sa'adoon Street, Baghdad
 Designer and builder: Mohammed Ghani Hikmat

Legacy
In 2015, the 70th Anniversary of the United Nations, the fountain Kahramana was chosen for the World National Heritage.

See also
 Arab culture
 Iraqi art
 Iraqi culture

References

Islamic metal art
Iraqi art
Iraqi folklore
Monuments and memorials in Iraq
One Thousand and One Nights characters